Herbert Lee Hill (August 19, 1891 – September 1, 1970) was a Major League Baseball pitcher who played for one season. He pitched in one game for the Cleveland Indians on July 17 during the 1915 Cleveland Indians season, pitching two innings.

External links

1891 births
1970 deaths
Major League Baseball pitchers
Cleveland Indians players
Baseball players from Dallas
Waterloo Jays players
Flint Vehicles players
Cleveland Spiders (minor league) players
South Bend Benders players
People from Farmers Branch, Texas